Diacanthostylus is a genus of beetles in the family Carabidae, containing the following species:

 Diacanthostylus benesi Morvan, 1998
 Diacanthostylus boulbeni Morvan, 1998
 Diacanthostylus elainus Bates, 1883
 Diacanthostylus integratus Bates, 1883
 Diacanthostylus jeanneli Jedlicka, 1934
 Diacanthostylus morimotoi Habu, 1954
 Diacanthostylus parens Fairmaire, 1889
 Diacanthostylus remondi Morvan, 1998
 Diacanthostylus sichuanus Morvan & Tian, 2003
 Diacanthostylus zengae Morvan & Tian, 2003

References

Platyninae